Rena Sinakin is an American record producer, singer-songwriter, musician, talent manager and promoter.

Life
Born in Miami, Florida, United States, and educated at the Pennsylvania Academy of the Fine Arts, Sinakin recorded on Capitol Records, with the album Make Music in 1973, eventually moving to Atlantic Records to work with Ahmet Ertegun and Leon Huff. Sinakin also co-produced with Richie Havens, Bruce Hawes, Victor Carstarphen, Roland Chambers, Robert A. Martin, Doug Grigsby, Phillip "Phoe Notes" Randolph and others.

Sinakin became the first female to produce a major act when she produced on the album The One and Only (1978) by Gladys Knight and the Pips. She acted as producer with John Lennon's band Elephant's Memory in 1980. She served as Executive Producer for McFadden and Whitehead's album  Movin' On on Capitol Records.

Sinakin ran Music City Recording Studio contracting with singers-songwriters including Bruce Hawes, Victor Carstarphen, Steve Wise and Joanna Gardner.

In the early 2000s Sinakin served as CEO of Fuge Entertainment.

Sinakin also produced shows for Jackson Browne, Melba Moore, Cuba Gooding, Betty Wright and many others at venues such as the Lincoln Center, Tribeca 360, and the Apollo Theater, The Legendary Dobbs, The Bitter End and others.

Sinakin is also noted as a fine artist/painter specializing in realistic portraiture, having hundreds of commissions and several album covers to her credit.

Sinakin currently promotes live shows and produces acts in Pennsylvania and is owner of Hit Lady Studios, located on her private island, working with young upcoming artists and performers of talent.

Partial discography
 Make Music – all tracks by Rena Sinakin unless noted
"Bad Luck Child" (Ralph Schuckett, Rena Sinakin) – 4:27 
"Can't You See" – 3:52
"Make Music" – 4:52
"Lover, I Love You" – 3:49 
"New York City" – 2:45 
"Thank You Mr. Love" – 3:08 
"I Didn't Know" (Bunny Sigler, Rena Sinakin) – 3:27 
"Don't Play With Love" – 2:19 
"Dream of Leon" – 3:20]

Atlantic Records
"I Didn't Know"
"I'm In Love Again"
"It's Not Easy To Say Goodbye"
"Pure Love In My Heart"
"Nobody Else"

Gladys Knight Arista Records
"The One And Only Gladys Knight"

McFadden & Whitehead Capitol Records
"Movin' On"
"One More Time"
"Without You"
"Tired Of Your Lies"
"Are You Lonely"
"Not With Me"
"Movin' On"
"Everything I do"
"Trying To Get Back"
"Riding On The Crest"
"The Best Of Me"

References

1949 births
Living people
American women record producers
Record producers from Florida
American women singer-songwriters
American singer-songwriters
21st-century American women